John Satterfield Fordtran (born November 1931) is an emeritus professor of gastroenterology and past president of the American Society for Clinical Investigation.

Education and career 
Fordtran was born in November 1931 in San Antonio, TX. He went to high school at the Texas Military Institute, graduating in 1949.

Fordtran graduated from the University of Texas at Austin in 1952 in biology, and from Tulane University in 1956 with an MD. He trained in internal medicine at Parkland Memorial Hospital from 1956 to 1958. He then briefly worked at the National Institutes of Health and as chair of medicine at Fort Defiance Indian Hospital in Arizona. He was a research fellow under Franz Ingelfinger from 1960 to 1962.

Donald Seldin recruited him back to UT Southwestern, where he started as an instructor and became chief of gastroenterology in 1963 and full professor of medicine in 1969.

He was elected to the American Society for Clinical Investigation in 1968 and was elected president in 1976.

Fordtran became chair of the department of medicine at Baylor University Medical Center in 1991.

Honors and awards 

 1984 King Faisal Prize in Medicine
 1971 American Gastroenterological Association (AGA) Distinguished Achievement Award
 1990 Joseph B. Kirsner Award for Distinguished Achievement in Clinical Research in Gastroenterology, Miles and Shirley Fiterman Foundation
 1991 NIH MERIT Award
 1991 Distinguished Educator Award, AGA

References 

American gastroenterologists
University of Texas Southwestern Medical Center faculty
Baylor University faculty
Tulane University School of Medicine alumni
1931 births
Living people